The Morgan-Curtis House is a historic house in Phenix City, Alabama, U.S.. It was built in 1914 for Dr. David Elias Morgan, a Welsh-born physician. It has been listed on the National Register of Historic Places since November 3, 1983.

References

Houses on the National Register of Historic Places in Alabama
Neoclassical architecture in Alabama
Houses completed in 1914
Houses in Russell County, Alabama